The 2014 season was the West Coast Eagles' 28th season in the Australian Football League (AFL), the premier Australian rules football competition. The 2014 season also marks the first season of the club's reserves affiliation with the East Perth Football Club in the West Australian Football League (WAFL). West Coast finished thirteenth in the previous season, despite having made the finals in the two preceding seasons. At the end of the 2013 season, previous coach John Worsfold retired, after twelve seasons in the position, and was replaced by Adam Simpson, who had not coached previously at AFL level. Darren Glass was retained as captain for a seventh season, with Josh Kennedy and Scott Selwood as vice-captains. However, Glass retired from football after round 12, and was replaced by five acting co-captains: Shannon Hurn, Kennedy, Eric Mackenzie, Matt Priddis, and Selwood. The club failed to qualify for the 2014 finals series, finishing its season in ninth place, with 11 wins and 11 losses. Priddis won the highest individual award, the Brownlow Medal, Beau Waters won the Jim Stynes Community Leadership Award, and Mackenzie was the club champion winning the John Worsfold Medal. No players from West Coast were selected on the All-Australian team.

Squad and leadership group
Darren Glass was initially named captain of the West Coast Eagles for a seventh season, having taken over from Chris Judd from the 2008 season. Scott Selwood and Josh Kennedy were named vice-captains, while Dean Cox and Matt Priddis were also named to the leadership group. Beau Waters, who had been sole vice-captain for the 2012 and 2013 seasons, stepped down from the role to concentrate on his recovery from persistent shoulder injuries. Leadership positions were voted on by the playing group as a whole, and confirmed by the senior coach, the match committee, and the board. Darren Glass announced his retirement from football prior to round 13 of the season. Five players were named acting co-captains for the remainder of the season: Shannon Hurn, Josh Kennedy, Eric Mackenzie, Matt Priddis, and Scott Selwood.

Pre-season

List changes and coaching changes
West Coast delisted Bradd Dalziell and Cale Morton at the end of the 2013 season. Murray Newman was also delisted, but was redrafted by the club with pick 38 in the 2014 Rookie Draft. Brad Dick, Andrew Embley, Ashton Hams, Daniel Kerr, Mark Nicoski, and Adam Selwood all retired from AFL football at various stages during and after the season. During the trade period,  player Xavier Ellis joined West Coast on a one-year contract as an unrestricted free agent. Midway through the season, in August 2014, West Coast signed former professional baseball player Corey Adamson, adding him to the rookie list under the three-year non-registered rule, which allows clubs to recruit players who have not been registered with an AFL-affiliated competition. He had previously played underage representative football for Western Australia.

The club's longest-serving senior coach, John Worsfold, resigned on 5 September 2013, after twelve seasons in the position. A number of candidates interviewed for the position, notably West Coast assistant Scott Burns,  assistant Adam Simpson,  assistant Peter Sumich, and  assistant Leigh Tudor. Simpson and Sumich, who had previously been an assistant under Worsfold, progressed to the final interview before the club's board, with Simpson announced as the club's new coach on 3 October 2013. A number of other coaching staff also left the club at the end of the 2013 season, though their departures were unrelated. After Adam Simpon's appointment as senior coach, former  player Brady Rawlings and former  and  player Adrian Hickmott were made assistant coaches, joining Justin Longmuir. Two previous West Coast players, Adam Selwood and Jaymie Graham, and another former North Melbourne player, Daniel Pratt, were also appointed to development coaching roles.

Trades and draft selections
Trades:
National Draft selections:
11 – Dom Sheed
31 – Malcolm Karpany
43 – Tom Barrass
49 – Dylan Main
61 – Jamie Bennell (via West Coast) (rookie upgrade)
74 – Jeremy McGovern (via West Coast) (rookie upgrade)
85 – Simon Tunbridge (via West Coast) (rookie upgrade)
Rookie Draft selections:
10 – Will Maginness (Oakleigh Chargers)
27 – Rowen Powell
38 – Murray Newman (via West Coast) (re-drafted)

NAB Challenge and practice matches
Unlike previous pre-season tournaments, the 2014 NAB Challenge did not have a grand final or overall winner, instead consisting of "18 games in 18 days", with each team playing twice. West Coast began by defeating  by 84 points at Arena Joondalup, and also won their second game, against  at Blacktown International Sportspark.

Home-and-away season

Results
Home team's score listed in bold:

source: West Coast Eagles, 11 August 2014

Tribunal cases
Seven West Coast Eagles players have so far been cited by the Match Review Panel during the 2014 season, with Patrick McGinnity, Luke Shuey, Darren Glass, Mark LeCras, and Josh Kennedy receiving suspensions:

Season records and milestones

Team records
Highest home attendance: 40,476 vs. Fremantle at Patersons Stadium, 4 May
Highest away attendance: 53,049 vs. Collingwood at the MCG, 24 May
Highest team score for: 30.8 (188) vs. GWS at Patersons Stadium, 11 May
Highest team score against: 19.9 (123) by Collingwood at the MCG, 24 May
Lowest team score for: 4.8 (32) vs. Geelong at Skilled Stadium, 12 April
Lowest team score against: 4.6 (30) by Melbourne at the MCG, 30 March
Great winning margin: 111 points vs. GWS at Patersons Stadium, 11 May
Greatest losing margin: 75 points vs. Geelong at Skilled Stadium, 12 April
Most consecutive wins: 3 (between rounds one and three)
Most consecutive losses: 4 (between rounds four and seven)
Source: AFL Tables, 11 August 2014

Player records
Club records
Most games: 19 – Jack Darling, Andrew Gaff, Eric Mackenzie, Matt Priddis
Most goals: 61.33 – Josh Kennedy
Most goals in a game: 11.0 – Josh Kennedy vs. GWS at Patersons Stadium, 11 May
Most disposals: 627 – Matt Priddis
Most kicks: 344 – Andrew Gaff
Most handballs: 366 – Matt Priddis
Most contested possessions: 330 - Matt Priddis
Most clearances: 147 – Matt Priddis
Most marks: 159 – Eric Mackenzie
Most contested marks: 30 – Jeremy McGovern
Most inside-50s: 88 – Luke Shuey
Most rebound-50s: 74 – Eric Mackenzie
Most tackles: 161 – Matt Priddis
Most hit-outs: 438 – Nic Naitanui
Source: AFL Tables, 31 August 2014

AFL season records
 Matt Priddis led the AFL in disposals (627) and handballs (366). He was also ranked second for clearances (147) and contested possessions (330), and third for tackles (161). He recorded 18 tackles against Richmond in round 18, a season record.
 Adam Carter was ranked second in the AFL for disposal efficiency (95%).
 Eric Mackenzie was ranked equal third in the AFL for one-percenters (174), and fourth for marks (159).
 Andrew Gaff was ranked fifth in the AFL for uncontested possessions (382).
 Josh Kennedy was ranked fifth in the AFL for goals (61) and behinds (33). He kicked 11 goals against GWS in round 8, a season record.
Sources: AFL.com.au and AFL Tables, 31 August 2014

Milestones
 Eric Mackenzie played his 100th AFL game in round one, against the Western Bulldogs.
 Josh Kennedy played his 100th game for West Coast in round two, against Melbourne. (Coincidentally, Sydney's Josh P. Kennedy also played his 100th game for his club in the same round).
 Dean Cox played his 276th AFL game in round three, against St Kilda, equalling Glen Jakovich's club record, and surpassed the mark the following round. He played his 100th consecutive game in round seven, against Fremantle.
 Chris Masten played his 100th AFL game in round three.
 Brad Sheppard played his 50th AFL game in round six, against Carlton.
 Will Schofield played his 100th AFL game in round 12, against Hawthorn.
 Nic Naitanui played his 100th AFL game in round 14, against Gold Coast.
 Matt Rosa played his 150th AFL game in round 15, against Fremantle.
 Xavier Ellis played his 100th AFL game in round 17, against Brisbane.

Debuts
 Dom Sheed made his AFL debut in round one, against the Western Bulldogs, while Jamie Bennell, Xavier Ellis, and Elliot Yeo each made their club debuts for West Coast in the same match, having previously played for other clubs.
 Brant Colledge made his AFL debut in round three, against St Kilda.
 Jeremy McGovern made his AFL debut in round six, against Carlton.

Ladder

Notes
 Carry-over points accrue following a sanction. For example, 123.45 points would draw a one-match suspension, with 23.45 carry-over points (for every 100 points, a one-match suspension is given).

References

External links
Australian Football League official website
West Coast Eagles official website

West Coast Eagles seasons
West Coast Eagles